Two Flaming Youths is a lost 1927 American silent comedy film directed by John Waters and written by John W. Conway, Donald Davis, Percy Heath, and Herman J. Mankiewicz. The film stars W. C. Fields, Chester Conklin, Mary Brian, Jack Luden, George Irving, and Cissy Fitzgerald. The film was released on December 17, 1927, by Paramount Pictures.

Plot
Sheriff Ben Holden is in love with hotel owner Madge Malarkey when down-and-out carnival man Gabby Gilfoil shows up, hoping to take her for some money. Gilfoil is mistaken for the wanted man Slippery Sawtelle. Neither suitor gets Malarkey but do manage to take her husband (wealthy Simeon Trott) for a bundle.

Cast
W. C. Fields as Gabby Gilfoil
Chester Conklin as Sheriff Ben Holden
Mary Brian as Mary Gilfoil 
Jack Luden as Tony Holden
George Irving as Simeon Trott
Cissy Fitzgerald as Madge Malarkey
James Quinn as Slippery Sawtelle (credited as Jimmy Quinn)
Ben Bard as Bard (as Pearl and Bard)
Jay Brennan as Brennan (as Savoy and Brennan)
Bobby Clark as Clark (as Clark & McCullough)
Max Dill as Dill (of Kolb and Dill)
Vivian Duncan as Vivian Duncan
Lew Fields as Fields (as Weber and Fields)
Clarence Kolb as Kolb (as Kolb and Dill) (credited as C. William Kolb)
Charles Mack as Mack (as Moran and Mack)
Chester Morton as The Human Pin Cushion
Lee W. Parker as The Tattooed Man
Jack Pearl as Pearl (as Pearl and Bard)
Billy Platt as The Dwarf (as William Platt)
Stanley Rogers as Savoy (as Savoy & Brennan)
John Seresheff as The Strong Man
Joe Weber as Weber (as Weber and Fields)
John Aasen as The Giant (uncredited)
Wallace Beery as Beery - of Beery and Hatton (uncredited)
Rosetta Duncan as Rosetta Duncam (uncredited)
Raymond Hatton as Hatton - of Beery and Hatton (uncredited)
Monty O'Grady as Minor Role (uncredited)

References

External links

Lobby poster
Stills at silenthollywood.com

1927 films
1920s English-language films
Silent American comedy films
1927 comedy films
Paramount Pictures films
Films directed by John Waters (director born 1893)
American black-and-white films
American silent feature films
Lost American films
Lost comedy films
1927 lost films
1920s American films